Jessica Rakoczy (born April 14, 1977) is a professional boxer and professional mixed martial arts fighter  from Hamilton, Ontario and seven time women lightweight boxing champion of the world.

Boxing career
Rakoczy made her professional boxing debut in October 2000. She has earned a record of 33 wins against 3 losses, with one no contest.

She is as a 3 time WIBA World Champion and 2 time former WBC Lightweight Champion. Most recently, she won the vacant WIBA Women's International Boxing Association super bantamweight title with a win against Ada Vélez on January 24, 2013.

Mixed martial arts career

Early career
Rakoczy made her professional MMA debut in October 2009. In five fights, she amassed a record of 1 win, 3 losses and one no contest.

The Ultimate Fighter
In August 2013, it was announced that Rakoczy was one of the fighters selected to be on The Ultimate Fighter: Team Rousey vs. Team Tate.

Rakoczy faced Revelina Berto in the elimination fight to get into the house. Despite both women being boxers, the majority of the fight was contested on the ground, where Rakoczy won via an armbar submission in the second round.

During her first tournament fight in the house, Rakoczy faced veteran Roxanne Modafferi. After losing the first round with it mostly being contested on the ground and struggling for takedowns, Rakoczy landed multiple punches on the feet in the second round. After several heavy blows landed and a slam against Modafferi's armbar attempt Rakoczy won via TKO.

In the semifinals, Rakoczy faced Raquel Pennington and won the fight via unanimous decision after three rounds.

Ultimate Fighting Championship
Rakoczy faced Julianna Peña in the finals on November 30, 2013 at The Ultimate Fighter 18 Finale. She lost the bout via TKO in the final seconds of the first round.

Rakoczy made her return to the UFC Octagon on April 25, 2015 in her strawweight debut against Valérie Létourneau at UFC 186 in Montreal, Quebec on April 25, 2015. She lost the fight via unanimous decision and was subsequently released from the UFC.

Championships and accomplishments

Boxing
International Boxing Association
IBA Women's Lightweight Championship (1 time)
North American Boxing Association
NABA Women's Lightweight Championship (1 time)
North American Boxing Federation
NABF Female Lightweight Championship (1 time)
Women's International Boxing Association
WIBA Intercontinental Lightweight Championship (1 time)
World Boxing Council
WBC Female World Lightweight Championship (2 times)

Mixed martial arts
Ultimate Fighting Championship
The Ultimate Fighter 18 Tournament Runner-Up
The Ultimate Fighter 18 Knockout of the Season

Mixed martial arts record

|-
| Loss
| align=center| 1–5 (1)
| Valérie Létourneau
| Decision (unanimous)
| UFC 186
| 
| align=center| 3
| align=center| 5:00
| Montreal, Quebec, Canada
| 
|-
| Loss
| align=center| 1–4 (1)
| Julianna Peña
| TKO (punches and elbows)
| The Ultimate Fighter 18 Finale
| 
| align=center| 1
| align=center| 4:59
| Las Vegas, Nevada, United States
| 
|-
| Win
| align=center| 1–3 (1)
| Kristen Gatz
| KO (punches)
| Tachi Palace Fights 14
| 
| align=center| 1
| align=center| 2:19
| Lemoore, California, United States
| 
|-
| NC
| align=center| 0–3 (1)
| Jennifer Scott
| No Contest (overturned)
| Millennium Events	
| 
| align=center| 2
| align=center| 5:00
| Las Vegas, Nevada, United States
| 
|-
| Loss
| align=center| 0–3
| Felice Herrig
| Decision (split)
| Bellator 14  	
| 
| align=center| 3
| align=center| 5:00
| Chicago, Illinois, United States
| 
|-
| Loss
| align=center| 0–2
| Zoila Frausto
| Submission (armbar)
| TPF 3: Champions Collide
| 
| align=center| 2
| align=center| 1:17
| Lemoore, California, United States
| 
|-
| Loss
| align=center| 0–1
| Michelle Ould
| TKO (punches)
| TPF 1: Tachi Palace Fights 1
| 
| align=center| 2
| align=center| 1:40
| Lemoore, California, United States
|

Mixed martial arts exhibition record

|-
| Win
| align=center| 3–0
| Raquel Pennington
| Decision (unanimous)
| The Ultimate Fighter: Team Rousey vs. Team Tate
|  (air date)
| align=center| 3
| align=center| 5:00
| Las Vegas, Nevada, United States
| 
|-
| Win
| align=center| 2–0
| Roxanne Modafferi
| TKO (slam & punches)
| The Ultimate Fighter: Team Rousey vs. Team Tate
|  (air date)
| align=center| 2
| align=center| 2:31
| Las Vegas, Nevada, United States
| 
|-
| Win
| align=center| 1–0
| Revelina Berto
| Submission (omoplata)
| The Ultimate Fighter: Team Rousey vs. Team Tate
|  (air date)
| align=center| 2
| align=center| 2:31
| Las Vegas, Nevada, United States
|

Professional boxing record

| style="text-align:center;" colspan="8"|33 Wins (12 knockouts, 21 decisions), 3 Losses (1 knockout, 2 decisions), 0 Draws, 1 No Contest
|-  style="text-align:center; background:#e3e3e3;"
|  style="border-style:none none solid solid; "|Res.
|  style="border-style:none none solid solid; "|Record
|  style="border-style:none none solid solid; "|Opponent
|  style="border-style:none none solid solid; "|Type
|  style="border-style:none none solid solid; "|Rd., Time
|  style="border-style:none none solid solid; "|Date
|  style="border-style:none none solid solid; "|Location
|  style="border-style:none none solid solid; "|Notes
|- align=center
|Win
|33–3 (1)
|align=left| Ada Vélez
|||
|
|align=left|
|align=left|Won the vacant WIBA Super Bantamweight Title.
|- align=center
|Win
|32–3 (1)
|align=left| Brittany Cruz
|||
|
|align=left|
|align=left|
|- align=center
|Win
|31–3 (1)
|align=left| Jessica Mohs
|||
|
|align=left|
|align=left|
|- align=center
|Win
|30–3 (1)
|align=left| Belinda Laracuente
|||
|
|align=left|
|align=left|
|- align=center
|Win
|29–3 (1)
|align=left| Cindy Serrano
|||
|
|align=left|
|align=left|
|- align=center
|Win
|28–3 (1)
|align=left| Belinda Laracuente
|||
|
|align=left|
|align=left|Defended the NABF Female Lightweight Title.
|- align=center
|Loss
|27–3 (1)
|align=left| Ann Saccurato
|||
|
|align=left|
|align=left|Lost the WBC Female Lightweight Title.
|- align=center
|Win
|27–2 (1)
|align=left| Terri Blair
|||
|
|align=left|
|align=left|
|- align=center
|Win
|26–2 (1)
|align=left| Kelli Cofer
|||
|
|align=left|
|align=left|Cofer suffered a cut eye from an accidental headbutt. Won the vacant WBC Female Lightweight Title.
|- align=center
|Win
|25–2 (1)
|align=left| Jessica Mohs
|||
|
|align=left|
|align=left|
|- align=center
|Win
|24–2 (1)
|align=left| Tawnyah Freeman
|||
|
|align=left|
|align=left|Won vacant NABF Female Lightweight Title.
|- align=center
|NC
|23–2 (1)
|align=left| Belinda Laracuente
|||
|
|align=left|
|align=left|Fight stopped after Rakoczy was cut from an accidental headbutt.
|- align=center
|Win
|23–2
|align=left| Angel McNamara
|||
|
|align=left|
|align=left|Won vacant WIBA Title.
|- align=center
|Win
|22–2
|align=left| Terri Blair
|||
|
|align=left|
|align=left|
|- align=center
|Win
|21–2
|align=left| Angel McNamara
|||
|
|align=left|
|align=left|
|- align=center
|Loss
|20–2
|align=left| Eliza Olson
|||
|
|align=left|
|align=left|Lost the IBA Female Lightweight Title & WBC Female Lightweight Title.
|- align=center
|Win
|20–1
|align=left| Jane Couch
|||
|
|align=left|
|align=left|Defended the IBA Female Lightweight Title & won vacant WBC Female Lightweight Title.
|- align=center
|Win
|19–1
|align=left| Belinda Laracuente
|||
|
|align=left|
|align=left|Defended the IBA Female Lightweight Title & won vacant NABA Female Lightweight Title.
|- align=center
|Win
|18–1
|align=left| Mia St. John
|||
|
|align=left|
|align=left|
|- align=center
|Win
|17–1
|align=left| Dana Kendrick
|||
|
|align=left|
|align=left|
|- align=center
|Win
|16–1
|align=left| Olivia Gerula
|||
|
|align=left|
|align=left|
|- align=center
|Win
|15–1
|align=left| Gloria Ramirez
|||
|
|align=left|
|align=left|
|- align=center
|Win
|14–1
|align=left| Mia St. John
|||
|
|align=left|
|align=left|
|- align=center
|Win
|13–1
|align=left| Lisa Lewis
|||
|
|align=left|
|align=left|Won vacant IBA Female Lightweight Title.
|- align=center
|Loss
|12–1
|align=left| Jenifer Alcorn
|||
|
|align=left|
|align=left|For vacant IWBF Lightweight Title.
|- align=center
|Win
|12–0
|align=left| Cheryl Nance
|||
|
|align=left|
|align=left|
|- align=center
|Win
|11–0
|align=left| Gail Muzzey
|||
|
|align=left|
|align=left|
|- align=center
|Win
|10–0
|align=left| Gloria Ramirez
|||
|
|align=left|
|align=left|
|- align=center
|Win
|9–0
|align=left| Layla McCarter
|||
|
|align=left|
|align=left|
|- align=center
|Win
|8–0
|align=left| Michelle Linden
|||
|
|align=left|
|align=left|
|- align=center
|Win
|7–0
|align=left| Mikee Stafford
|||
|
|align=left|
|align=left|
|- align=center
|Win
|6–0
|align=left| Imelda Arias
|||
|
|align=left|
|align=left|
|- align=center
|Win
|5–0
|align=left| Vicky Clardy
|||
|
|align=left|
|align=left|
|- align=center
|Win
|4–0
|align=left| Mikee Stafford
|||
|
|align=left|
|align=left|
|- align=center
|Win
|3–0
|align=left| Mary Wells	
|||
|
|align=left|
|align=left|
|- align=center
|Win
|2–0
|align=left| Josephine Bracamontes	
|||
|
|align=left|
|align=left|
|- align=center
|Win
|1–0
|align=left| Chris Sepulvado
|||
|
|align=left|
|align=left|

See also
 List of current UFC fighters
 List of female mixed martial artists
 List of Canadian UFC fighters

References

External links
 Jessica Rakoczy Awakening Profile
 
 
 

1977 births
Living people
Canadian women boxers
World lightweight boxing champions
Sportspeople from Hamilton, Ontario
Canadian people of Hungarian descent
Canadian sportspeople in doping cases
Canadian practitioners of Brazilian jiu-jitsu
Female Brazilian jiu-jitsu practitioners
Doping cases in mixed martial arts
Canadian female mixed martial artists
Bantamweight mixed martial artists
Strawweight mixed martial artists
Mixed martial artists utilizing boxing
Lightweight boxers
World boxing champions
Ultimate Fighting Championship female fighters